CPB may refer to:

Companies
 Campbell Soup Company, an American producer of canned soups and related products
 Campbell Brothers, an Australian laboratory and manufacturing company
 Crispin Porter + Bogusky, an advertising agency
 Corporate Express (airline), a defunct Canadian airline

Organizations
 Capitol Police Board, the body that governs the United States Capitol Police
 Confederación Panamericana de Billar, the governing body of carom billiards in the Americas
 Corporation for Public Broadcasting, a publicly funded non-profit corporation in the United States
 CPB (Netherlands), a government agency in the Netherlands
 Crown Property Bureau, a quasi-government agency in Thailand
 École nationale supérieure de chimie et de physique de Bordeaux, one of the French grandes écoles

Political parties
 Communist Party of Bangladesh
 Communist Party of Brazil
 Communist Party of Britain
 Communist Party of Burma
 Communist Party of Belarus
 Communist Party of Byelorussia
 Communist Party of Belgium
 Communist Party of Bulgaria

Technology
 Cardiopulmonary bypass pump, also known as a "heart-lung machine"
 Charged particle beam of electrically charged particles
 Cycles per byte, a unit of execution cost of a computer algorithm
 Cyclic permutated binary, a type of digital code in computing
 Coded Picture Buffer, a buffer for encoded video frames used in video decoding
 A celiac plexus block is a nerve block used to treat chronic pain in the abdomen
 Continuous Power Bridge, typically used to power low wattage devices from a gang switched streetlight
 AMD Core Performance Boost Technology, aka AMD Turbo Core

Other
 Cell Phone Bikini, 2016 album by Omar Rodríguez-López
 The Citizens Protection Bureau, a fictional police organization in the Total Recall 2070 television series
 Camilla Parker Bowles, wife of King Charles III
 Central Planning Board, term used in market socialism theory
 Crippled Black Phoenix, a British post-rock supergroup
 Certified Medical Biller, a certification from AAPC for healthcare supporting professionals